Nobody Does It Better is the debut studio album by American R&B singer Gina Thompson. It was released through Mercury Records on August 13, 1996. The album was led by the hit single, "The Things That You Do". The "Bad Boy Remix", featuring Missy Elliott, version of the song was released as the official lead single. The song peaked at 41 on the Billboard Hot 100 and at 12 on the Billboard Hot R&B/Hip-Hop Songs. The debut album peaked at 36 on the Hot R&B/Hip-Hop albums.

Track listing

 "Rodalude"
 "The Things That You Do"
 "Nobody Does It Better"
 "Can't Go Another Minute"
 "Angel"
 "Freak On"
 "Can't Help Myself"
 "He'll Make a Way (Interlude)"
 "Put Me On"
 "Into You"
 "Strung Out"
 "Without You"
 "He'll Make a Way (Interlude #2)"
 "I Can't Wait" (featuring Ill Al Skratch)
 "The Things That You Do (Bad Boy Remix)" (featuring Missy Elliott)

References

External links
 
 
 
 http://www.discogs.com/Gina-Thompson-The-Things-That-You-Do/release/1018549

1996 debut albums
Mercury Records albums